Monna Tandberg  ( born 2 July 1939) is a Norwegian actress.

Personal life 
She was born in Oslo to physician Morten Odd Tandberg and painter Nora Heffermehl. She has been married to Per Bronken and Arild Brinchmann, and from 1993 she lived with actor Lars Andreas Larssen.

Career 
Tandberg made her stage debut at Nationaltheatret in 1960, in the play Det smeller i dørene, an adaptation of Michel Fermaud's .

She was assigned with Fjernsynsteatret from 1961 to 1964, and with Det Norske Teatret from 1964 to 1969. She has been appointed at Nationaltheatret since 1969, where she has played more than sixty roles.

Awards
Tandberg was decorated Knight, first Class of the Order of St. Olav in 2007. She received the Gammleng Award in 2009.

References

1939 births
Living people
Actresses from Oslo
Norwegian actresses